Pål "Magic" Johnsen (born March 17, 1976 in Hamar) is a retired Norwegian hockey player, who most of his career played for the Storhamar Dragons in the GET-ligaen (top league in Norway). Johnsen made his debut for the senior team as a 16-year-old in December, 1992 against Hasle/Løren. Since then was  loyal to Storhamar except for two seasons in Sweden with Leksands IF and Skellefteå AIK 2000–02. Johnsen got 48 official games for the national team, and received the Golden Puck award as the Norwegian player of the year in 2000.

External links
Stats from Eurhockey.net

Profile at Storhamar Dragons home page

1976 births
Living people
Sportspeople from Hamar
Norwegian ice hockey centres
Storhamar Dragons players
Leksands IF players
Skellefteå AIK players
Norwegian expatriate ice hockey people